These are the official results of the Women's 4x400 metres event at the 1991 IAAF World Championships in Tokyo, Japan. Their final was held on Sunday September 1, 1991.

Schedule
All times are Japan Standard Time (UTC+9)

Final

Heats
Held on Saturday 1991-08-31

See also
 1988 Women's Olympic 4 × 400 m Relay (Seoul)
 1990 Women's European Championships 4 × 400 m Relay (Split)
 1992 Women's Olympic 4 × 400 m Relay (Barcelona)
 1993 Women's World Championships 4 × 400 m Relay (Stuttgart)
 1994 Women's European Championships 4 × 400 m Relay (Helsinki)

References
 Results

 
Relays at the World Athletics Championships
1991 in women's athletics